Kennedy Kane "Ken" McArthur  (February 10, 1881 – June 13, 1960) is most noted as a track and field athlete and winner of the marathon at the 1912 Summer Olympics.

Biography
Born in Dervock, County Antrim, Ireland, McArthur was recognised as a promising athlete as a teenager, but he didn't pursue an athletics career until after emigrating to South Africa in 1901 at the age of 20.

After joining the Johannesburg Police Force in 1906, McArthur begun to take athletics seriously. Soon he had won the Transvaal half and one mile championships, the five mile track championship and also two national cross country championships.

McArthur ran his first marathon late in the 1908 season, and surprisingly beat the Olympic silver medalist Charles Hefferon. He also won the national one and ten mile championships.

The Stockholm Olympic marathon took place in sweltering heat. Representing South Africa in the event, McArthur and his teammate Christian Gitsham ran together and soon took the lead. Confident of victory, Gitsham stopped for water, expecting his colleague to join him, as agreed. Instead McArthur ran on, stretching his lead and taking him to certain victory over Gitsham by 58 seconds.

In the next season, McArthur injured his foot in an accident and was forced to retire from athletics. He ran six marathon races (including the Olympic marathon) throughout his career and never lost one.

References

External links
 
 Kennedy McArthur at the South African Sport and Arts Hall of Fame

1881 births
1960 deaths
Irish emigrants to South Africa
South African male long-distance runners
South African male marathon runners
Sportspeople from County Antrim
Olympic athletes of South Africa
Athletes (track and field) at the 1912 Summer Olympics
Olympic gold medalists for South Africa
Medalists at the 1912 Summer Olympics
South African police officers
Irish male marathon runners
Irish male long-distance runners
Olympic gold medalists in athletics (track and field)